The 2004 IAAF Golden League was a series of track and field meetings organised by the International Association of Athletics Federations.

Originally taking place in Oslo, Rome, Monaco, Zürich, Brussels and Berlin, the Bislett Games was temporarily moved from Oslo to Fana (Bergen) due to the redevelopment of the Bislett stadion. The athletes (in selected events) who won their event at all six meetings took a share of a $1 million jackpot.

Jackpot winners

2004 results
Golden background indicates selected Golden League event.

References 
 IAAF report of 'Bislett Games' 2004
 IAAF report of 'Meeting Gaz de France' 2004
 IAAF report of 'Golden Gala' 2004
 IAAF report of 'Weltklasse Zürich' 2004
 IAAF report of 'Memorial van Damme' 2004
 IAAF report of 'ISTAF' 2004

Golden League
IAAF Golden League